This article shows the rosters of all participating teams at the women's rugby sevens tournament at the 2018 Commonwealth Games in Gold Coast, Queensland.

Pool A

Australia

Canada

South Africa

Kenya

Pool B

New Zealand

England

Fiji

Wales

References

Commonwealth Games rugby sevens squads